The Louie B. Nunn Cumberland Parkway is a  east–west controlled-access highway in the U.S. state of Kentucky, extending from Barren County in the west to Somerset in the east. It is one of seven named highways designated in Kentucky's parkway system.

Route description
The parkway begins at an interchange with Interstate 65 (exit 43) between Smiths Grove and Park City. It travels east through rolling farmland to its eastern terminus at US 27 on the north side of Somerset. The road parallels Kentucky Route 80 for its entire length.  The parkway passes the cities of Glasgow, Edmonton, Columbia, and Russell Springs. It passes near two popular state parks:  Lake Cumberland State Resort Park and Barren River Lake State Resort Park. The length of the parkway is designated unsigned Kentucky Route 9008 (LN 9008).

History

The road is named after Louie B. Nunn, a former Kentucky governor from Barren County, who was instrumental in the road's creation. Originally called the Cumberland Parkway from its opening in 1972-1973, it was renamed for Nunn in 2000.

The Nunn Parkway, as with all nine parkways, was originally a toll road.  By Kentucky state law, toll collection ceases when enough toll has been collected or funds received from other sources, such as a legislative appropriation, to pay off the construction bonds for the parkway. In the case of the Nunn, toll booths were removed in 2003 because of a bill in the United States Congress sponsored by Hal Rogers (R-KY), which included an appropriation to pay off the bonds on the parkway as well as the Daniel Boone Parkway in eastern Kentucky. The state legislature then renamed the Boone Parkway for Rogers, which sparked a controversy among residents of the region and the offspring of Boone. Nunn tried to calm the controversy by suggesting the state rename the Nunn Parkway for Rogers instead, restoring the Boone name, saying that the Cumberland Parkway had been named for Nunn without his consent.

Toll plazas and prices 
The parkway had three toll plazas upon opening in 1973. A fourth one opened at the Nancy exit on the eastbound on-ramp and westbound off-ramp when that interchange opened in the 1980s.

21st century
Presumably, the Nunn Parkway was built to Interstate Highway standards at its time of construction aside from some at-grade intersections and traffic signals near its east end, which were eliminated in 2010 by constructing a northwestern bypass around Somerset. The east end of the parkway is currently a partial cloverleaf at U.S. 27.  The bypass was constructed as part of the now-cancelled I-66 proposed extension through Kentucky.

New interchange in Glasgow
On May 28, 2015, a new interchange was opened west of Glasgow to serve the western extension of the Veterans Outer Loop. The eastern extension of that road has been opened in early 2012, complete with the opening of exit 15, which serves the eastern extension of Veterans Outer Loop, designated at KY 1519. The state highway designation for the western extension was announced as Kentucky Route 3600. Upon completion of the new western extension of the Veterans Outer Loop, it includes the new on- and off-ramps of the Cumberland Parkway, and a new at-grade intersection with Kentucky Route 1297.

Future

On August 5, 2021, Congress released a new infrastructure bill that proposed to designate the whole length of the Cumberland Parkway as a Future Interstate, with the designation of I-365. The designation would need approval from AASHTO, the FHWA, and upgrades of several interchanges and some improvements before the designation could be implemented.

Exit list

References

External links

KentuckyRoads.com — Louie B. Nunn Cumberland Parkway
Exit Guide for Nunn Parkway

9008
Kentucky parkway system
Interstate 66
Transportation in Adair County, Kentucky
Transportation in Barren County, Kentucky
Transportation in Metcalfe County, Kentucky
Transportation in Pulaski County, Kentucky
Transportation in Russell County, Kentucky